Eremonotus may refer to:
 Eremonotus (fly), a genus of flies in the family Asilidae
 Eremonotus (plant), a genus of liverworts in the family Jungermanniaceae